Hitting the High Spots is a 1918 American silent comedy-drama film, directed by Charles Swickard. It stars Bert Lytell, Eileen Percy, and Winter Hall, and was released on December 9, 1918.

Cast list
Bert Lytell as Bob Durland
Eileen Percy as Alice Randolph
Winter Hall as Morgan Randolph
Helen Dunbar as Mrs. Randolph
Gordon Griffith as Jack Randolph
Fred Goodwins as Harold Blake
Ilean Hume as Tonia
Stanton Heck as Von Holke
Al Edmundson as Lopez
William Eagle Eye as Jose
William Courtright as Felipe

References

External links 
 
 
 

1910s English-language films
American silent feature films
American black-and-white films
Films directed by Charles Swickard
Metro Pictures films
1918 comedy-drama films
1918 films
1910s American films
Silent American comedy-drama films